Shafer's Mill is a house near Middletown, Maryland, built in the early 19th century.  The Federal style house was built for John Shafer, Jr., and was occupied after his death by his son, Peter.  The Shafers operated four mills in the Middletown area. The house, however, was never operated as a mill.

References

External links
, including photo in 2004, at Maryland Historical Trust

Houses on the National Register of Historic Places in Maryland
Federal architecture in Maryland
Houses completed in 1812
Houses in Frederick County, Maryland
National Register of Historic Places in Frederick County, Maryland